was a Japanese former football player belonged to SC Sagamihara. Now,he is a professional track cyclist.

Club statistics
Updated to 23 February 2018.

References

External links

Profile at Kataller Toyama

1990 births
Living people
Kindai University alumni
Association football people from Kanagawa Prefecture
Japanese footballers
J2 League players
J3 League players
Japan Football League players
FC Machida Zelvia players
Matsumoto Yamaga FC players
Kataller Toyama players
SC Sagamihara players
Association football midfielders